The Women's Allam British Open 2018 is the women's edition of the 2018 British Open Squash Championships, which is a 2017–18 PSA World Tour event (Prize money : $165,000 ). The event took place at the Airco Arena in Hull in England from 13 to 20 May. Nour El Sherbini won her second British Open trophy, beating Raneem El Weleily in the final.

Seeds

Draw and results

See also
2018 Men's British Open Squash Championship

References

2010s in Kingston upon Hull
Women's British Open
Women's British Open
May 2018 sports events in the United Kingdom
Women's British Open Squash Championships
Sport in Kingston upon Hull
Squash in England